Titus Sextius Cornelius Africanus, also known as Titus Sextius Africanus, was a Roman Senator who lived in the Roman Empire in the second half of the 1st century and first half of the 2nd century. He served as an ordinary consul in 112 as the colleague of emperor Trajan.

Africanus was a member of the Roman Republican gens Sextia. He was the son of Titus Sextius Magius Lateranus, ordinary consul in 94, and his wife Volusia Torquata.

Family 
Africanus married a Roman noblewoman from the gens Vibia, and their children are known to include:

 Sextia (born c. 120), who married Appius Claudius Pulcher, a suffect consul of the 2nd century;
 Titus Sextius Lateranus, also known by his full name T. Sextius Lateranus M. Vibius Ovel[lius?...] Secundus L. Vol[usius Torquatus?] Vestinus or Titus Sextius… Marcus Vibius Qui[etus(?)] Secundus Lucius Vol[usius Torquatus (?)] Vestinus. He served as ordinary consul in 154 as the colleague of emperor Lucius Verus.

References

Sources
 J. Bennett, Trajan: Optimus Princeps: a Life and Times, Routledge, 1997
 Biographischer Index der Antike (Google eBook), Walter de Gruyter, 2001
 I. Mennen, Power and Status of the Roman Empire, AD 193-284, BRILL, 2011

1st-century Romans
2nd-century Romans
Imperial Roman consuls
Cornelius Africanus, Titus